The Komata River is a river of New Zealand's North Island. It flows west from the Coromandel Range, reaching the Waihou River just north of Paeroa.

See also
List of rivers of New Zealand

References

Thames-Coromandel District
Rivers of Waikato
Rivers of New Zealand
Hauraki Gulf catchment